Səmədabad (also, Samedabad) is a village and municipality in the Goranboy Rayon of Azerbaijan.  It has a population of 1,245. The municipality consists of the villages of Səmədabad and Xəsədərli.

References 

Populated places in Goranboy District